Lány may refer to places in the Czech Republic:

Lány (Chrudim District), a municipality and village in the Pardubice Region
Lány (Havlíčkův Brod District), a municipality and village in the Vysočina Region
Lány (Kladno District), a municipality and village in the Central Bohemian Region, known for Lány Castle
Lány u Dašic, a municipality and village in the South Bohemian Region
Lány, a village and part of Červené Janovice in the Central Bohemian Region
Lány, a village and part of Kostomlaty nad Labem in the Central Bohemian Region
Lány, a village and part of Lázně Bělohrad in the Hradec Králové Region
Lány, a town part of Litomyšl in the Pardubice Region
Lány, a town part of Svitavy in the Pardubice Region
Lány na Důlku, a village and part of Pardubice in the Pardubice Region